Titans All Access is a magazine-style television program that focuses on the Tennessee Titans, the National Football League franchise based in Nashville, Tennessee. Hosted by Titans Radio Network on-air personality Mike Keith, along with Amie Wells, the show is produced by Fox network affiliate WZTV in association with the franchise. It premiered in September 2002. Episodes are aired during NFL Football season on either Friday, Saturdays, or Sundays, depending on the station.

It will premiere its 22nd season at the beginning of the 2023 NFL season.

Format
Long-form behind-the-scenes stories are featured in this program, along with reviews of the previous game, and the previews of upcoming Titans games. Interviews with players, as well as insights from Titans general manager Ruston Webster are also featured.

Stations
In Nashville, Titans All Access is aired on WZTV on Saturdays at 11:30 a.m., and Sundays at 10:30 a.m. MyNetworkTV affiliate WUXP also airs the program at 10:30 a.m. Saturdays. The program is also seen in the Bowling Green, Kentucky market thanks to WZTV's carriage on select cable systems and, more importantly, WZTV and WUXP's over-the-air coverage in that area.

In addition to the broadcast episodes, archived episodes, some from past seasons, can be streamed on the Titans official website and on the team's YouTube channel.

See also
Tennessee Titans

References

External links
TitansOnline.com
WZTV Official Website 
Titans All Access – Show Website featuring Titans news and information provided by WZTV/Fox 17 Sports.

 

Tennessee Titans
Mass media in Tennessee
Mass media in Nashville, Tennessee
2002 American television series debuts
First-run syndicated television programs in the United States
Television shows set in Tennessee